The 1939 German Ice Hockey Championship was the 23rd season of the German Ice Hockey Championship, the national championship of Germany. EK Engelmann Wien won the championship by defeating Berliner Schlittschuhclub in the final.

First round

Group A

Group B

Semifinals

3rd place

Final

References

External links
German ice hockey standings 1933-1945

Ger
German Ice Hockey Championship seasons
Champ